Mir Shams ol Din Rural District is a rural district (dehestan) in the Central District of Tonekabon County, Mazandaran Province, Iran. At the 2006 census, its population was 8,270, in 2,402 families. The rural district has 8 villages.

References 

Rural Districts of Mazandaran Province
Tonekabon County